Cyperus pseudopilosus is a species of sedge that is native to tropical and western parts of the Africa.

See also 
 List of Cyperus species

References 

pseudopilosus
Plants described in 2007
Flora of Angola
Flora of Cameroon
Flora of the Central African Republic
Flora of the Democratic Republic of the Congo
Flora of the Republic of the Congo
Flora of Uganda
Flora of Liberia
Flora of Ivory Coast
Flora of Guinea
Flora of Equatorial Guinea